The Paul Harland Prize is the oldest annual award for original Dutch short science fiction, fantasy or horror stories. It is named after Dutch science fiction author Paul Harland, who died in 2003.

This award is for short stories and novelettes with a word count up to 10,000 words.

History 
The award was presented for the first time in 1976 by SF fan and critic Rob Vooren, on the occasion of a short story contest which had been organised that same year. Initially, Vooren called it the King Kong Award, and also published an irregular fanzine with the same name.

Over the next ten years, the contest was mostly organised by Rob Vooren, who not only assembled the jury, but also ensured availability of the prize money (usually 1000 guilders), and later enlisted the help of a publisher. In 1984 this finally resulted in professional publication for the award winners.

In 1987 Rob Vooren handed over the organisation for the last time, to a rotating committee. For reasons of credibility, and with a view to attracting more sponsors, it was decided in 1996 to change the name to Millennium Prize. Following the death of Paul Harland, who had not only won the award several times, but had also organised it, in addition to being on the jury more often than almost anyone else, the prize was given his name in 2003.

Starting in 2011 the Prize is being organized by author Martijn Lindeboom and beginning 2013 he works together with author Thomas Olde Heuvelt. 2013 was a record year: 206 stories were sent in (totaling about 1.3 million words).

Winning authors

See also 
 Unleash Award

External links 
 Official website (Dutch)

Science fiction awards
Dutch literary awards
H
Awards established in 1976